Night Night at the First Landing is the debut studio album by American singer-songwriter Madeline Kenney. It was released on September 1, 2017, via Company Records.

Background
The album was written by Kenney and was produced by Chaz Bundick, who is also known as Chaz Bear. The songs in the album were described as "seeming to focus more on moody thoughtfulness than a specific message." PopMatters rated the album with 8 out of 10 and described it as a reliably satisfying listen.

Kenney was initially unfamiliar with the musical style of Bear, who asked her if he could produce the album. She said "Chaz came to one of our shows and afterwards he came up to me and was like, ‘That was really great. I want to record you’ and I was like, ‘Okay!’ and ‘Oh, whatever!’".

Track listing

References

2017 debut albums
Madeline Kenney albums